is a Japanese professional footballer who plays as a midfielder for Finnish club IF Gnistan.

Career statistics

Club

Notes

References

1995 births
Living people
Japanese footballers
Japanese expatriate footballers
Association football defenders
Liga Portugal 2 players
Campeonato de Portugal (league) players
FC Hennef 05 players
Leixões S.C. players
GD Bragança players
C.F. Estrela da Amadora players
Japanese expatriate sportspeople in Germany
Expatriate footballers in Germany
Japanese expatriate sportspeople in Portugal
Expatriate footballers in Portugal